The Sagittarius A* cluster is the cluster of stars in close orbit around Sagittarius A*, the supermassive black hole at the center of the Milky Way (in the Galactic Center). The individual stars are often listed as "S-stars", but their names and IDs are not formalized, and stars can have different numbers in different catalogues.

One of the most studied stars is S2, a relatively bright star that also passes close by Sgr A*.

Its orbital period is 12 years, but an extreme eccentricity of 0.985 gives it the close approach and high velocity.

List of stars 
The inferred orbits of stars around supermassive black hole candidate Sagittarius A* at the Milky Way's center are according to Gillessen et al. 2017, with the exception of S2 which is from GRAVITY 2019, S62 which is from Peißker et al. Jan 2020, and S4711 up to S4715, which are also from Peißker et al., Aug 2020.

Here id1 is the star's name in the Gillessen catalog and id2 in the catalog of the University of California, Los Angeles. a, e, i, Ω and ω are standard orbital elements, with a measured in arcseconds. Tp is the epoch of pericenter passage, P is the orbital period in years and Kmag is the K-band apparent magnitude of the star. q and v are the pericenter distance in AU and pericenter speed in percent of the speed of light, and Δ indicates the standard deviation of the associated quantities.

References 

Sagittarius (constellation)
Star clusters